A trecena is a 13-day period used in pre-Columbian Mesoamerican calendars. The 260-day calendar (the tonalpohualli) was divided into 20 trecenas. Trecena is derived from the Spanish chroniclers and translates to "a group of thirteen" in the same way that a dozen (or in Spanish docena) relates to the number twelve. It is associated with the Aztecs, but is called different names in the calendars of the Maya, Zapotec, Mixtec, and others of the region.

Many surviving Mesoamerican codices, such as Codex Borbonicus, are divinatory calendars, based on the 260-day year, with each page representing one trecena.

See also
 Aztec calendar
 Maya calendar
 Tonalpohualli
 K'atun

Mesoamerican calendars